Landscape at Collioure is an oil-on-canvas painting by French artist Henri Matisse from 1905. It is typical of his Fauvist style of the period. It is part of the collection of the Museum of Modern Art, in New York.

External links
Museum of Modern Art collection page

1905 paintings
Paintings by Henri Matisse
Paintings in the collection of the Museum of Modern Art (New York City)
Landscape paintings
Fauvism